Tekovská Breznica is a municipality in the Žarnovica District, Banská Bystrica Region in Slovakia.

Location
The village is 5 km south of Nová Baňa and about 15 km south of Žarnovica.

History
It was first mentioned in 1276 when the Benedictine Abbey of Hronský Beňadik protested against the Archbishopric of Esztergom occupying the property of the Abbey in the Breznica border.

The castle was built by the archbishop of Esztergom in the late 13th century. Matthew III Csák took it by digging a tunnel under the castle walls. After the death of Matthew Csák in 1321, it was again the property of the archbishop. It was recruited in the 15th century. After the unsuccessful conspiracy of the archbishop János Vitéz against King Matthias Corvinus in 1472 it was taken by the king.

In 1564 the village belonged to the Revište dominium owned by the Dóczy family. In 1568 it was devastated by the Ottoman troops. Aga Mustafa, the Ottoman governor of Esztergom, devastated again the village in 1647, when a lot of inhabitants was slaughtered, others were dragged by Ottomans.

In 1720, 44 taxpayers lived in the settlement. In 1768 there were 63 peasant houses, 11 cotter huts and 2 noble mansions in Tekovská Breznica. In 1766 the Banská Bystrica Bishopric was the landowner in the village. In 1828 there were 136 houses and 788 inhabitants. In 1910 there were 1177 mainly Slovak inhabitants.

Until the Treaty of Trianon in 1920, the village belonged to the Aranyosmarót district of Bars county of the Kingdom of Hungary.

Sights
Scarce ruins of castle Breznica on the top of the 445 m high hill by the village
Virgin Mary Roman Catholic church built in 1734, transformed into Baroque style in 1777, recruited and improved in 1913

References

External links
Castle Breznica in English (photos, data)
Info site

Villages and municipalities in Žarnovica District